Funicello is an Italian surname. Notable people with the surname include:

 Annette Funicello (1942–2013), American singer and actress
 Giuseppe Funicello (born 1987), Italian-American footballer and coach

Italian-language surnames